Margaritaville Cafe: Late Night is the name of a series of three compilation albums by singers and bands that performed at various Margaritaville Cafes, commercial ventures of American singer-songwriter Jimmy Buffett.  The first two albums, Margaritaville Cafe: Late Night Menu and Margaritaville Cafe: Late Night Gumbo feature studio recordings including three and two songs respectively by Buffett.  The third album, Margaritaville Cafe: Late Night Live, was recorded live at Margaritaville Cafe New Orleans and is credited to Club Trini, a duo of Michael Utley and Robert Greenidge, two members of Buffett's Coral Reefer Band, with other Coral Reefers such as Nadirah Shakoor.  Buffett also appears on the album.

Margaritaville Cafe: Late Night Menu
Margaritaville Cafe: Late Night Menu features studio recordings by singers and bands that performed at Margaritaville Cafe in Key West, Florida.  It was released in 1993 on MCA 10824 and has a running time of 71:23.

Track listing
"Eanna's Socatash" – Amy Lee & Nicky Yarling (Nicole Yarling) – 3:49
"I Walk Alone" – Rockerfellas (Andrew Berlin, Kim Frederick, Robert Richardson, Bob Ronco) – 3:17
"Morning Glory" – Deanna Bogart (Deanna Bogart) – 2:41
"Lost Boy" – Greg "Fingers" Taylor (Tim Krekel, Greg "Fingers" Taylor) – 3:19
"Club 15" – The Nace Brothers (Jimmy Nace) – 3:28
"Conch Soca" – The Survivors (E.R. Allen) – 3:17
"Another Saturday Night" – Jimmy Buffett (Sam Cooke) – 3:10
"Everything I Say" – Rockerfellas (Jim Muller, Bob Ronco) – 2:15
"India" – PM (Roger Guth, Jim Mayer, Peter Mayer) – 4:29
"Pan Classique In B Minor (Mad Music)" – Michael Utley / Robert Greenidge (Robert Greenidge) – 4:00
"Some White People Can Dance" – Greg "Fingers" Taylor (Jimmy Buffett, Tim Krekel, Greg "Fingers" Taylor, Michael Utley) – 4:03
"Great Big Fanny" – Bill Wharton "Sauce Boss" (Bill Wharton) – 3:27
"Hurtin' Kind" – Little Nicky & The Slicks (Nicole Yarling) – 3:25
"Let The Big Dog Eat" – Bill Wharton "Sauce Boss" (Bill Wharton) – 2:35
"Do Nothin' Man, (Don't No Woman Want A)" – Little Nicky & The Slicks (Nicole Yarling) – 3:56
"Sugartown Shakedown" – Amy Lee & Nicky Yarling (Amy Lee) – 4:22
"Reggae Accident" – Jimmy Buffett (Lucas P. Gravell) – 4:55
"Key Lime Squeeze" – The Survivors (James Allen) – 4:07
"Coco Loco" – Michael Utley / Robert Greenidge (Michael Utley) – 3:34
"Souvenirs" – Jimmy Buffett (Vince Melamed, Danny O'Keefe) – 3:14

Margaritaville Cafe: Late Night Gumbo
Margaritaville Cafe: Late Night Gumbo features studio recordings by singers and bands that performed at Margaritaville Cafe in New Orleans, Louisiana. The two songs performed by Jimmy Buffett on this release, "Sea Cruise" and "Goodnight Irene", include backing musicians Mike Utley, Tim Krekel, and Michael Organ.  It was released in 1995 on Margaritaville 535012 and has a running time of 54:55.

Track listing
"Don't Stop" – Rebirth Brass Band (Philip Frazier) – 3:43
"Please Don't Leave Me" – Rockin' Dopsie Jr. (Fats Domino) – 3:08
"I'm Going Down To Bourbon Street" – Waylon Thibodeaux (Waylon Thibodeaux) – 3:35
"Eatin' With Fingers" – The Iguanas (Joe Cabral) – 3:31
"Sea Cruise" – Jimmy Buffett (Huey "Piano" Smith) – 3:34
"Stringbean" – Bluerunners (Steve LeBlanc, Mark Meaux) – 3:44
"I'm Coming Home" – Rockin' Dopsie Jr. (Clifton Chenier) – 4:06
"Come Back Baby" – Waylon Thibodeaux (Waylon Thibodeaux) – 3:03
"Why Ya Whit Me" – Rebirth Brass Band (Ajay Mallery, Roderick Paulin) – 3:54
"Canecutter" – Bluerunners (Clifton Chenier) – 4:23
"Here's To Love" – Waylon Thibodeaux (Clay Courville, Waylon Thibodeaux) – 3:30
"Popeye's A Hubigs" – Jumpin' Johnny Sansone (Ricky Oliverez, Jumpin' Johnny Sansone) – 2:37
"Got You On My Mind" – The Iguanas (Howard Biggs, Joe "Cornbread" Thomas) – 4:30
"Blue Co." – Bluerunners (Mark Meaux) – 3:07
"Goodnight Irene" – Jimmy Buffett (Leadbelly, John A. Lomax) – 4:30

Margaritaville Cafe: Late Night Live
Margaritaville Cafe: Late Night Live was recorded live at Margaritaville Cafe in New Orleans, Louisiana, and was released in 2000 on Mailboat 2001 with a running time of 64:28.  It is credited to Club Trini which includes Robert Greenridge (steel drums) and Michael Utley (keyboards) as well as Peter Mayer (vocals, guitar), Nadirah Shakoor (vocals), Jim Mayer (bass, background vocals), Roger Guth (drums), Ralph MacDonald (percussion), all members of Jimmy Buffett's Coral Reefer Band.  Buffett himself sang and played guitar on some tracks as well.  The album was produced by Utley and Greenridge.

Track listing
"Viajero" (Michael Utley) – 6:15
"Club Trini (Back in Town)" (Robert Greenidge) – 6:51
"Soltar" (Michael Utley) – 6:06
"Paradise Garden" (Robert Greenidge) – 4:11
"Party Time" (Robert Greenidge) – 5:50
"African Friend" (Jimmy Buffett) – 3:19
"Jimmy's Intro" – 1:20
"Come on In" (Jimmy Buffett, Ralph MacDonald, Bill Salter) – 5:04
"Cairo" (Johnny Candoso) – 3:55
"New Orleans Medley: Storyville Parade/Ya Ya Yumbo/Shango" (Michael Utley) – 3:52
"Sweet Heat" (Michael Utley) – 7:46
"Madd Music" (Robert Greenidge) – 3:34
"No Woman, No Cry" (Vincent Ford, Bob Marley) – 6:25

See also
Jimmy Buffett discography

References

Compilation album series
Jimmy Buffett compilation albums
1993 compilation albums
1995 compilation albums
2000 live albums
Jimmy Buffett live albums
Mailboat Records live albums
Mailboat Records compilation albums